Mary Oyaya is a Kenyan actress and model. She is best known for the role of Jedi Master Luminara Unduli in the American blockbuster film, Star Wars: Episode II – Attack of the Clones.

Personal life
She was born in Mombasa, Kenya as the eldest child in a family of four siblings. She received her master's degree in International Relations and then completed a second master's degree in International Social Development, both from the University of New South Wales.

After moving to Australia, she continued to appear in television commercials and advertisements.

Career
She has worked for the United Nations since a young age. She mainly worked with refugees in Australia for several NGOs. While studying, she pursued a modeling career. She featured in several fashion magazines such as 'CAT' and 'S'. In the meantime, she appeared in advertisements with Salvatore Ferragamo and Gucci sunglasses, Chanel and Jan Logan jewelry and footwear with Sergio Rossi.

Mary has starred in television commercials for Telstra Communications, Hewlett Packard Bell, and various sports advertisements. In 1999, she acted in the SciFi network TV series, Farscape. During this period, she ventured into film productions, such as Lost Souls and Down and Under. In 2002, she appeared as Jedi Master Luminara Unduli in the American blockbuster film Star Wars: Episode II – Attack of the Clones.

Filmography

References

External links
 

Living people
21st-century Kenyan actresses
Kenyan emigrants to Australia
Kenyan television actresses
People from Mombasa
Year of birth missing (living people)
University of New South Wales alumni